Georg Rauer (1880, Vienna – 1935, Vienna) was a Viennese violin maker.

He studied under Karel Haudek (Karl (Carl) Haudek, Karl (Carl) Haudeck, Karel Houdek; 1721, Dobříš1802), later employed by Gabriel Lemböck (1814, Buda1892, Vienna). Rauer passed his “Gesellenprüfung” in 1897, and went “auf der Waltz” to Budapest. He worked for master Wilhelm Thomas Theodor Jaura before opening his own shop. He was one of the best Viennese violin makers of this period and was also very well known as a dealer of the expensive instruments. Later he taught Karel Josef Dvořák. Instruments made by Georg Rauer have a warm, powerful sound with great depth of tone.

His instruments are generally marked G.R. / Georg Rauer / Geigenmacher in Wien Anno 19..

Czech cellist  plays a Georg Rauer 1921 cello.

References 

20th-century Austrian people
1880 births
1935 deaths
Austrian musical instrument makers
Businesspeople from Vienna
Music in Vienna